Thomas Otto Shankland (born 7 May 1968) is an English film and television director and screenwriter. He is known for directing the horror films WΔZ (2007) and The Children (2008), and television series such as The Fades (2011), Ripper Street (2012), and The Missing (2014); for the latter, he was nominated for the 2015 Primetime Emmy Award for Outstanding Directing for a Miniseries, Movie or a Dramatic Special. He has also been nominated for the BAFTA Award for Best Short Film twice, for Bait (1999) and Going Down (2000).

Background and education
Shankland's father taught at Durham University, establishing the Italian department. His mother is Scandinavian. The family watched Italian and Scandinavian film. He went to school at St Margaret’s Primary School and Framwellgate Moor Comprehensive. He first gained visibility with a short film for Channel 4 called Bait in 1999.

Filmography

Film
 Bubbles (1998; short)
 Bait (1999; short)
 Going Down (2000; short)
 WΔZ (2007)
 The Children (2008)

Television
 Hearts and Bones (2000; episode: "Once There Was a Way to Get Back Home")
 Clocking Off (2001; 3 episodes)
 No Night Is Too Long (2002; television film)
 Family Business (2004; episode "1.01")
 Jericho (2005; episode: "The Hollow Men")
 Agatha Christie's Marple (2006–10; 2 episodes)
 The Fades (2011; 3 episodes)
 Dirk Gently (2012; 3 episodes)
 Ripper Street (2012; 4 episodes)
 The Missing (2014; 8 episodes)
 Wicked City (2015; episode: "Pilot")
 The Leftovers (2015; 1 episode)
 House of Cards (2016; 1 episode)
 Iron Fist (2017; 1 episode)
 The Punisher (2017; 2 episodes)
 The City and the City (2018; miniseries)
 Les Misérables (2018; miniseries)
 The Serpent (2021; miniseries)
 SAS: Rogue Heroes (2022; miniseries)

Awards and nominations

References

External links
 

1968 births
Living people
English film directors
English screenwriters
English male screenwriters
English television directors
People from Durham, England